Saint Thomas Aquinas High School is a private, Roman Catholic high school in Overland Park, Kansas, United States, serving students in grades 9-12. It is located in the Roman Catholic Archdiocese of Kansas City in Kansas. The current co-chaplains are Fr. Andrew Gaffney and Fr. Brent Stull; the president is Brian Schenck, and the principal is Craig Moss; vice-principles are Kara DiCarlo, and Lori Greeson. Saint Thomas Aquinas is one of several private high schools located in the Kansas City Metropolitan Area. The school colors are navy blue and old gold. 

The school was established in 1988 in order to accommodate the growing Roman Catholic population in south Johnson County. It is the successor to St. Joseph/Aquinas High School, which was located in the present-day Saint Joseph Early Education Center in Shawnee, Kansas.

Saint Thomas Aquinas is a member of the Kansas State High School Activities Association and offers a variety of sports programs. Athletic teams compete in the 5A division (Football competed in 4A for the 22-23 season) and are known as the "Saints".  Extracurricular activities are also offered in the form of performing arts, school publications, and clubs.

History

St. Joseph and Aquinas High School
St. Joseph high school opened in 1931 (first graduating class in 1934) as a co-educational parish high school for St. Joseph Roman Catholic parish in Shawnee, Kansas. In 1980, responsibility for the high school was expanded from just St. Joseph parish to the entire Archdiocese of Kansas City in Kansas. To reflect this, the name was changed to "Aquinas High School," after Thomas Aquinas, patron saint of Catholic schools. The Shawnee campus could accommodate about two hundred students.

Saint Thomas Aquinas High School
The Archdiocese takeover included plans to open a new larger building on land adjacent to Johnson County Community College in Overland Park, about 6.5 miles south and one mile west of the Shawnee campus. The new building, which could accommodate more than one thousand students, was open for the 1988-89 school year. The name was expanded from "Aquinas High School" to "Saint Thomas Aquinas High School" at the new building, as well as a new athletic nickname: "The Saints."

The Shawnee high school building was returned to St. Joseph parish, which uses the gymnasium and stadium for its primary school and for CYO competitions, and operates the St. Joseph Early Education Center in other parts of the building.

Major expansions to the current campus began in 1991 with the addition of a stadium, theater and performing arts wing, air conditioning in classrooms, and a second classroom building. The second building was originally referred to as "SMC" because it housed the Johnson County offices of Saint Mary College, which held classes in the building at night.

In 2002 an "Auxiliary Gym" was added to the main building to allow more athletic practices and events to occur simultaneously. 

The new Innovation Lab makerspace/classroom and an adjacent hallway attaching the former SMC building to the main building were added in 2017, along with a new strength and training facility, and better access to the Auxiliary Gym via a new hallway.

Academics

In 2012, Saint Thomas Aquinas was awarded the Blue Ribbon Award for excellence in education by the US Department of Education. For the 2008–09 and 2009-2010 school years, Saint Thomas Aquinas was recognized by the Kansas State Board of Education for achieving excellence in reading, writing and mathematics.

For classes beginning in 2011, 27 credits are required for graduation.

Extracurricular activities

Non-athletic programs

Choir Program
Saint Thomas Aquinas has a total of five choirs. The Swingin' Saints (Mixed Show Choir), Saintsations (Girls Show Choir), girls chorale, concert choir, and chamber choir. Concert choir, chamber, and chorale have received multiple "One" ratings at the KSHSAA Large Group Contest.  The two show choirs compete at competitions in Missouri, Iowa, and Nebraska.

Debate/Forensics
The school offers debate and forensics programs for students. The debate program has won several state championships in its history.

 The debate team won KSHSAA state championships in 2006, 2008 and 2011.

Athletics
Saint Thomas Aquinas athletic teams are known as the Saints. They compete in the Eastern Kansas League and are members of the Kansas State High School Activities Association. The Saints have won two National Championships (boys soccer, 1994 and 2009), 105 KSHSAA state championships, 56 state runner-up championships, and 265 league/district/regional/sub-state championships. That includes a record eight KSHSAA championships during the 2006–2007 school year.

Soccer
The Saints have won a combined 32 state championships in boys' and girls' soccer, which includes eight straight state titles for boys from 2003 to 2010 and seven straight state titles for the girls from 2010 to 2016. Additionally, the boys' team won the National Championship in 1994 and 2009 according to the National Soccer Coaches Association of America. After winning the National Championship in 2009, head coach Craig Ewing was honored as the NSCAA national boys coach of the year for private and parochial schools by the National Soccer Coaches Association of America.  Ewing had twice previously been selected as the NSCAA's girls soccer coach of the year.

Cross country

The cross country program has been a state championship contender since the very first season. The girls team placed second at the 1988 4A championship and second in 5A in 1991. 

In 2006, both teams won the state title. The Saints have repeated the state sweep in 2008, 2014, 2015, 2016 and 2018. 

The 2013 Aquinas girls team set an unbreakable record at the championship with a perfect score of 15 as all five Aquinas runners finished in the top five spots. 

In 2015 the boys set the state meet record with a score of 22 points Aquinas runners taking the top four spots. 

Golf
The girls' golf team were the first Saints to win a KSHSAA championship, in the fall of 1992. They won again in 1996 and 1997. The Saints won in 2002, placed second in 2003 and 2004, then won six consecutive championships from 2007 to 2012 and have had multiple individual champions as well. The girls golf team won the school's 100th state championship in 2017, then repeated in 2018.

The boys' golf team placed second seven times from 1995 to 2006. The Saints finally won in 2007, repeated in 2008, won again in 2011, 2016, 2017 and has also produced individual state champions.

Football
The school alumni undertook an ambitious effort to raise $500,000 to replace the football field's turf in 2022.  Aquinas' head football coach is Randy Dreiling, who came to Aquinas in 2013 after successfully coaching the Hutchinson High School Salthawks.

State championships

Exchange programs
The school has an exchange program with Yonago High School in Yonago, Japan.

Notable alumni
Drake Dunsmore, former professional football player in the National Football League 
Lisa Kerney, professional sports broadcaster/anchor for ESPN
Kyle Miller, professional  Major League Soccer player
Riley Pint, professional Major League Baseball player 
Brian Smith, former NFL player
Michael Thomas, professional Major League Soccer player
Ryan Mueller, former professional football player in the National Football League
Janine DiVita, Broadway theatre and screen actress
Angel Reda, Broadway theatre and screen actress

References

Catholic secondary schools in Kansas
Education in Overland Park, Kansas
Educational institutions established in 1988
Schools in Johnson County, Kansas
1988 establishments in Kansas